Frank Sherwin (1896-1986) was born in Derby and studied at the Derby School of Art and then in Chelsea, London at the Heatherleys School of Fine Art.

He specialised in watercolours, but is remembered for the railway posters which promoted travel to holiday destinations around Britain and were very much part of the railways in the days of steam. He did posters for GWR, LMS, LNER & British Rail.

During the war he was an advisor to the War Office on the camouflage of air fields. It is also said that some of his paintings were used in wartime posters.

For the last forty six years of his life he lived in the High Street, in Cookham Village in Berkshire. There was an exhibition of his work at the Cookham Festival in 2007.  Cookham is also the village of Sir Stanley Spencer, one of England's most renowned artists.

Frank died in 1986 at Slough.

References
 Full Listing of Railway Carriage Prints (from Greg Norden)
 Historical Cookham - Frank Sherwin Watercolour Artist

External links 
 

1896 births
1986 deaths
Alumni of the Heatherley School of Fine Art
English artists
People from Derby
British railway artists